Nyctonympha taeniata is a species of beetle in the family Cerambycidae. It was described by Martins and Galileo in 1992. It is known from Panama and Trinidad and Tobago.

References

Forsteriini
Beetles described in 1992